Pidcock may refer to:

Pidcock, Georgia, an unincorporated community in the United States

People with the name Pidcock
 Geoffrey Pidcock (1897–1976), senior officer in Britain's Royal Air Force 
 James N. Pidcock (1836–1899), American politician
 Laura Pidcock (born 1987), British politician
 Tom Pidcock (born 1999), English cyclist

See also
 Pidcock's Canal, in Gloucestershire, England
 Pidcock Creek (Delaware River), a tributary of the Delaware River, in Pennsylvania, United States
 Pitcock (disambiguation)